Pirmin Adrian Meier (born February 21, 1947) is a Swiss author and teacher (also in the field of adult education). To fellow writer Hansjörg Schneider, Meier is "der eigenständigste und eigenwilligste Schweizer Geschichtsschreiber seiner Generation" ("the most independent-minded and original Swiss writer of history in his generation").

Life and career
Pirmin Meier was born into a butcher's family and grew up in Würenlingen. From 1963 to 1967, he attended the Benediktiner-Kollegium (a gymnasium) in Sarnen and then went on to study German language and literature, philosophy and history at the University of Zürich, where he received his PhD for a work on Reinhold Schneider in 1975. Subsequently, he worked as a school teacher and a journalist and served as joint editor in the publishing of the works of Reinhold Schneider by Suhrkamp and Insel (today a subsidiary of Suhrkamp). He also is a member of the Reinhold Schneider-Gesellschaft e.V.

Since 1979 he's been dividing this time primarily between teaching Philosophy, German and other subjects at a gymnasium in Beromünster and researching and writing his books which focus on portraying historical figures, places and traditions in broad scope and great detail.

Unusual for him, in 1984, Meier published Gsottniger Werwolf (which translates as "boiled werewolf"), a collection of poems, written in free-verse form and rife with literary allusions.

2004 saw the première of the miracle play Licht überm Tüchelweg (music by Stephan Meier) and in 2007, the Vitus-Oratorium aka Sankt Vitus in Merenschwand (music by Enrico Lavarini) was given its first performance; for both of these projects Meier provided the libretto.

He currently resides in Rickenbach.

Literary style and themes
It's not easy to peg Meier's writings – often of strongly bio- or monographical content – to any particular discipline or literary genre. Most of his books are oscillating heavily between nonfiction and fiction, between historiographical scholarly paper and historical novel.

Although meticulously researched and diligently sourced, Meier doesn't limit himself to a rigid and terse presentation of facts but employs a literary language, engages in speculation where sources are sparse or nonexistent and also otherwise often applies novelistic techniques, for example by delving into the psyche of his characters. One might consider his approach as veering into the so-called nonfiction novel territory, but then it doesn't seem to fully square with how Truman Capote coined that term, either. So it is probably best described by Meier himself who gave his book about Heinrich Federer the subtitle "eine erzählerische Recherche" ("a narrational research").

All his historical protagonists are creative thinkers whose ideas, convictions, actions and conditions often made them outsiders or even social misfits facing considerable obstacles throughout their lives. So far, these include:

Franz Desgouttes
Heinrich Federer
Heinrich Hössli
Jacques-Barthélemy Micheli du Crest
Paracelsus
Reinhold Schneider
Eduard Spörri
Niklaus von Flüe
Joseph Viktor von Scheffel

(for the exact titles, see Selected works below)

Awards and honors

Selected works

References

External links

Pirmin Meier in AdS' Lexikon der Autorinnen und Autoren der Schweiz 
Pirmin Meier in Bibliomedia's Lexikon der Schweizer Autorinnen und Autoren 
 
Reinhold Schneider-Gesellschaft e.V. – Official website 

1947 births
Living people
People from Baden District, Aargau
Swiss Roman Catholics
Swiss writers in German
Swiss schoolteachers
University of Zurich alumni
20th-century Swiss writers
21st-century Swiss writers
21st-century Swiss educators
20th-century Swiss educators